Dominique Perroud (born 1935) is a French sailor. He competed in the 5.5 Metre event at the 1956 Summer Olympics.

References

External links
 

1935 births
Living people
French male sailors (sport)
Olympic sailors of France
Sailors at the 1956 Summer Olympics – 5.5 Metre
Place of birth missing (living people)